The Sino-Tibetan and Tai people of Assam are the different groups of people who migrated from East Asia and Southeast Asia into the Brahmaputra Valley during the ancient and medieval period. Today, they represent a major portion of the population of Assam and have made a strong impact on the social, cultural and political aspects of the state.

History
There were several waves of migration of Sino-Tibetan and Tai people into Assam.

Pre-historic
The ancestors of the Sino-Tibetan speakers are thought to have lived in the upper-middle Yellow River basin about 10,000 – 5,000 years ago and developed one of the earliest Neolithic cultures in East Asia. In Northeast India, Tibeto-Burman expansion throughout Brahmaputra Valley is associated with the patrilinial lineage of O-M134 which occurs at a high frequency of 85% in Kachari (Boro Kachari) peoples and 76.5% in Rabha peoples.

Medieval

The second wave were the Tai speakers led by a Shan group called Tai-Ahom when Sukaphaa lead his group into Assam via the Pangsau pass in the Patkai from present-day South China. The Ahoms were followed by other Tai people who were Buddhists: Khamti, Khamyang, Aiton, Phake and Turung who settled in Upper Assam and Arunachal Pradesh.

State formation

Mleccha dynasty is a Tibeto-Burman dynasty which ruled almost the entire Brahmaputra Valley from 655-900.

Varman and Pala dynasty are highly controversial. According to Sunit Kumar Chatterjee these two dynasties are also Tibeto-Burman. Hugh B. Urban (2011) too infers that the Varmans descended from non-Aryan tribes.

During the medieval period, most of the state formations were done by the these people. The most prominent of them were the Ahom, Chutia, Kachari Kingdom and the Koch dynasty.

The Ahom kingdom was located in what is now Sivasagar district, Assam, and later on, it expanded to control the entire Assam valley. The Chutia had their center of power on the north bank of Brahmaputra in eastern Assam from Parshuram Kund in Arunachal Pradesh to Vishwanath in Sonitpur district of Assam. The Kachari rulers controlled the areas of south Assam, while the Koch dynasty held their power in present western Assam districts. Among other dynasties, Borahi and Moran had their vassal-chiefdoms in eastern Assam. Matak state was formed in the late 18th century. They are composed of various strata spread across entire eastern Assam.

Groups

This is a list of groups of Sino-Tibetan and Tai people living in Assam:

References

Bibliography

Navigation 

Sino-Tibetan languages

Social groups of Assam